Ross McCausland (born 12 May 2003) is a Northern Irish footballer who plays for Scottish club Rangers.

Career
McCausland joined the Rangers Academy from Northern Irish side Linfield in the summer 2019. He signed a contract extension with the club until 2024

McCausland made his debut for Rangers by replacing Amad Diallo as a 61st minute substitute during a 3–1 win over Heart of Midlothian on 14 May 2022.

References

External links

2003 births
Living people
Association footballers from Northern Ireland
Association football midfielders
Rangers F.C. players
Linfield F.C. players
Scottish Professional Football League players
Lowland Football League players
Northern Ireland youth international footballers